Andrew Rindom Lindegaard (born 10 September 1980) is an English former footballer who is most famous for playing at Yeovil Town. He played as a full back, but was also deployed as midfielder occasionally.

Career 
He first played for local side Westland Sports in the Dorset Combination league, before joining Yeovil Town. In 2003, Lindegaard signed for Weymouth on loan. In September 2005, he signed for Crawley Town on a one-month loan. Lindegaard's loan was extended by a month and he returned to the Glovers in November 2005. In 2007, Lindegaard signed for Cheltenham Town after being released by Yeovil. He signed on loan for Aldershot Town in 2009, where he scored once against Gillingham. He was released by the Robins at the end of the 2008–09 season and signed for his former club, Yeovil Town. He left Yeovil in January 2010 after deciding not to renew his contract. Lindegaard signed for Truro City in 2010.

Personal life 
In 2010, Lindegaard and his sister-in-law set up a fitness company, Dymond Strength.

Career statistics

Honours
Yeovil Town
FA Trophy: 2001–02

References

External links

1980 births
Living people
People from Yeovil
English footballers
Association football defenders
Westland Sports F.C. players
Yeovil Town F.C. players
Weymouth F.C. players
Crawley Town F.C. players
Cheltenham Town F.C. players
Aldershot Town F.C. players
Truro City F.C. players
National League (English football) players
English Football League players
Southern Football League players